Ngawa Tibetan and Qiang Autonomous Prefecture, also known as Aba, is an autonomous prefecture of northwestern Sichuan, bordering Gansu to the north and northeast and Qinghai to the northwest. The population was 919,987 in late 2013.

The county of Wenchuan in Ngawa is the site of the epicenter of the 2008 Sichuan earthquake, in which over 20,000 of its residents died and 40,000 were injured.

History and names 
During the reign of Tibet's king Trisong Deutsen in the 8th century, the Gyalrong area was visited by the great translator Vairotsana.

In 1410 Je Tsongkhapa's student Tshakho Ngawang Tapa established the first Tibetan Buddhist Gelug school monastery in the area, called "Gyalrong".

In contemporary history, most of Ngawa was under the 16th Administrative Prefecture of Szechwan, which was established by the Republic of China (ROC).

The People's Republic of China defeated ROC troops in this area during Chinese Civil war and subsequently established a Tibetan autonomous prefecture by late 1952. It was renamed Aba Tibetan Autonomous Prefecture in 1956 and Aba Tibetan and Qiang Autonomous Prefecture in 1987.

On May 12, 2008, a major earthquake occurred in Wenchuan County, a county in the southeastern part of this autonomous prefecture. 20,258 people were killed, 45,079 injured, 7,696 missing in the prefecture as of June 6, 2008.

In 2009, the town of Ngaba in Ngawa prefecture became the self-immolation capital of the world. From 2009 to 2019, more than 60 of Tibet's total 156 self-immolations occurred in Ngaba. By 2020, the town's entrances were barricaded and surveillance cameras installed, with some 50,000 security personnel for the town's population of 15,000.

In 2008, Aba county was stripped of its internet connections. Internet access in the prefecture remains severely restricted as of 2013.

Geography

Most of the prefecture lies in the Tibetan cultural and historical region of Amdo. The west, and part of Kardze, is also known as Gyalrong. Gyalrong people speak a Qiangic language known as Gyalrong language. The source of the Min River and its tributary Dadu River are to be found in Ngawa.

Demographics 
, the prefecture's population was 919,987 inhabitants at a density of 10.91 per km2:

Languages
Major languages spoken in Aba Prefecture include Tibetan, Mandarin Chinese and many vernaculars of the Qiangic languages which vary from county to county:
Barkam: rGyalrong
Li County: Southern Qiang, rGyalrong
Mao County: Northern Qiang, Southern Qiang
Jiuzhaigou County: Baima
Jinchuan County: Khroskyabs, rGyalrong
Xiaojin County: rGyalrong
Heishui County: Northern Qiang, rGyalrong
Zamtang County: Amdo Tibetan

In April 2020, classroom instruction was switched from Tibetan to Mandarin Chinese in Ngaba.

Administrative divisions 
The region is composed of one county-level city and twelve counties:

Though situated within Wenchuan County, Wolong National Nature Reserve and Wolong Special Administrative Region are administered separately by the Forestry Department of Sichuan.

Transportation

The prefecture is served by Hongyuan Airport in the west and Jiuzhai Huanglong Airport in the east. Private taxis can be hired from these airports. The railway is to run between Chengdu and Lanzhou.

Tourism 

Tourism produced 71.0% of the GDP of the prefecture in 2006. There are many places of interest in the prefecture, including

 Wolong National Nature Reserve in Wenchuan County, a well-known giant panda reserve where the China Conservation and Research Center for the Giant Panda was established in 1980
Kirti Gompa, a 15th-century Tibetan Buddhism monastery
Nangzhik Gompa monastery, founded in the 12th century
 Huanglong Scenic and Historic Interest Area in Songpan County
 Jiuzhaigou, Jiuzhaigou County, a nature reserve known for its many multi-level waterfalls and colorful lakes, declared a UNESCO World Heritage Site in 1992
 Mount Siguniang (  "Sku Mountain"; formerly , a transcription), the highest point of the Qionglai Mountains,  on the border between Xiaojin County and Wenchuan County.

References

Further reading 
Barbara Demick (2020) Eat the Buddha: Life and Death in a Tibetan Town. New York: Random House.
 A. Gruschke (2001) The Cultural Monuments of Tibet’s Outer Provinces: Amdo - Volume 2. The Gansu and Sichuan Parts of Amdo. Bangkok: White Lotus Press 
 Tsering Shakya (1999) The Dragon in the Land of Snows.: a history of modern Tibet since 1947, London: Pimlico, 1999,

External links

Aba, China - Official website of Prefectural Government

 
Tibetan autonomous prefectures
Prefecture-level divisions of Sichuan
Qiang people